Priluk is a rural locality (a village) in Gorodetskoye Rural Settlement, Kichmengsko-Gorodetsky District, Vologda Oblast, Russia. The population was 73 as of 2002.

Geography 
Priluk is located 43 km northwest of Kichmengsky Gorodok (the district's administrative centre) by road. Sarayevo is the nearest rural locality.

References 

Rural localities in Kichmengsko-Gorodetsky District